Audrey Lamy (born 19 January 1981) is a French actress and humorist. She is also the sister of the actress Alexandra Lamy.

Personal life
Audrey Lamy is Alexandra Lamy's younger sister.

Since 2008, Audrey is in a relationship with Thomas.

Filmography

Feature films

Television

Dubbing

Theatre

Awards and nominations

Étoile d’Or

César Award

Globes de Cristal Awards

Molière Award

Grand Prix des séries

References

External links

 

1981 births
Living people
French film actresses
French television actresses
21st-century French actresses
People from Alès